South Hadley Public Schools, also known as South Hadley School Department, is a school district in South Hadley, Massachusetts, United States. The superintendent is Nicholas Young.

Governance
A five-person school committee, the equivalent of a board of education elsewhere, oversees the school district.  The chairman of the school committee is John Kelly.

Schools
The district operates the following schools:
Plains Elementary School
Mosier Elementary School
Michael E. Smith Middle School
South Hadley High School

Bullying incident

South Hadley High School came to the attention of the national news media as the result of the suicide of 15-year-old student Phoebe Prince on January 14, 2010.

References

External links
Official site

School districts in Massachusetts
Education in Hampshire County, Massachusetts